Coomonte is a municipality located in the province of Zamora, Castile and León, Spain. According to the 2009 Census (INE), the municipality has a population of around 253 inhabitants.

References

Municipalities of the Province of Zamora